The Oxnard Oil Field is a large and currently productive oil field in and adjacent to the city of Oxnard, in Ventura County, California in the United States.  Its conventional oil reserves are close to exhaustion, with only an estimated one percent of the original oil recoverable with current technology remaining:   out of an original 43.5 million.  However, the reservoir includes an enormous deposit of tar sands, ultra-heavy oil classed as an unconventional petroleum reserve, and potentially containing  of oil equivalent, should it become economically feasible to extract.  Present operators on the field include Tri-Valley Oil & Gas Co., Anterra Energy Services, Inc., Chase Production Co., and Occidental Petroleum through its Vintage Production subsidiary.  As of the beginning of 2009, there were 34 active wells on the field.

Geographic setting

The Oxnard Oil Field is one of several beneath the Oxnard Plain, an area mostly protected agricultural land with the communities of Ventura, Oxnard, and Camarillo separated by greenbelts. In the vicinity of the oil field, agriculture remains the predominant land use, and oil wells, processing facilities, and associated infrastructure are interspersed with fields planted with crops such as strawberries, broccoli, and onions. Parts of the field, particularly on the west, have been given over to light industrial and commercial development as the Oxnard metropolitan area expands to the east. U.S. Highway 101 bounds the field on the north; California State Route 34 (Oxnard's East 5th Street) cuts across it from east to west, and Rice Avenue crosses it from north to south. Most of the currently active oil wells are in the eastern portion of the field, west of the intersection of 5th Street and Pleasant Valley Road. Some active wells remain west of Rice Avenue, and a group of wells using directional drilling is clustered together in a drilling island near the northeast corner of the intersection of Rose Avenue and Wooley Road.

The climate in the region is Mediterranean, with cool, rainy winters and warm, rainless summers, in which the heat is moderated by frequent morning coastal low clouds and fog.
It is mostly flat, with a very gentle slope to the south-southeast; drainage is along Revolon Slough to Calleguas Creek to Mugu Lagoon, and then to the Pacific Ocean.

Geology

The Oxnard field is within the Ventura Basin Province of southern California.  Geologically, this area is part of a structural downwarp that occurred during the late Pliocene.  Rocks within the region are all sedimentary and mostly marine.  Oil accumulations, of which there are many in the Ventura province, mainly occur in anticlinal settings modified by faulting; stratigraphy is also influential in creating traps for hydrocarbons.  Where the sedimentary rocks are sandstones with high porosity, and the structure and stratigraphy allow hydrocarbons to be trapped on their upward migration, oilfields are found.

As the oil field is in the center of a large flat alluvial floodplain, there is no surface expression of any anticlinal structure capable of holding oil.  Under the surface alluvium, a series of relatively impermeable sedimentary units cap the petroleum-bearing formation.  On top are the Pleistocene San Pedro and Pleistocene-upper Pliocene 
This producing horizon is named the "McInnes" pool, and is in the Oligocene-age Sespe Formation.

The Oxnard field contains a large quantity of tar sand, a type of bitumen which is categorized as an unconventional oil deposit. Only a tiny fraction of this has been brought to the surface to date, although Tri-Valley Corporation is actively developing the unit by drilling horizontal wells through the sands and subjecting them to the cyclic steam process.

The quality of the oil from the lower pools is good and the gravity medium, at 24 to 38 API, while the oil from the tar sand is extremely heavy and of poor quality, with an extraordinarily high sulfur content – API gravity of 7, viscosity of 28,000 to 33,000 centipoise, and sulfur content of between 5 and 7.5 percent by weight.

History, production and operations

More adventurous drillers found deeper producing horizons with lighter oil.  In 1953 and 1954 the McInnes, Lucas, and Livingston pools were brought online, producing oil of API gravity 24, 32 and 25-36 respectively.  Waterflooding operations in these deeper reservoirs in the 1960s assisted production, but most wells in these horizons were abandoned as the last economically recoverable oil was extracted; a few remained as water disposal wells, as it is usually both economically and environmentally preferable to reinject wastewater back into a depleted reservoir than to treat and release it on the surface.  In 2008 only two wells remained active in the deep McInnes reservoir; all the others were in the shallow tar sands.

Under the California Department of Conservation well adoption rule, Tri-Valley Oil & Gas Company acquired 20 wells formerly operated by defunct GEO Petroleum, Inc., which filed for Chapter 11 bankruptcy protection in 1998.  Wells declared deserted by the State – typically due to the dissolution of the operator – are open to adoption and redevelopment under the "orphan well" rule, with the written consent of the owner of the mineral rights to the property as well as the State Department of Oil, Gas, and Geothermal Resources.  In 2008 Tri-Valley began redeveloping these wells and bringing them back to production.

Oil produced in the field goes to the small (-per-day) Oxnard Refinery, owned by Tenby, Inc., in an unincorporated area south of Fifth Street near the eastern Oxnard city limit.  This refinery also processes oil from the West Montalvo field on the coast directly west of the Oxnard field.

Oil field waste
Anterra operates the only commercial facility that disposes oil field waste through injection wells in the county. In 1998, Anadime Energy Services Inc. applied for permission from the county of Ventura to operate a commercial disposal site at 1933 E. Wooley Road near the Oxnard city limits. This Canadian firm accepted waste from other oil field operators, mostly brine, and injects it thousands of feet into the ground. This permit held by Anterra will expire in 2018 and the commercial oil disposal sites in agricultural land are no longer permitted by county zoning law. The county Board of Supervisors eliminated such a use in farmland two years after the 1998 permit was issued. They also denied a zoning change in 2015 that would have allowed expansion of the facility citing the many places of open space and industrial zones where the oil field disposal sites are permitted. They were unconvinced by the testimony that Ventura County, as the third-largest oil-producing region in the state, needs to allow brines to be disposed of effectively and cheaply. Anterra can still apply to continue operations at the current level when the permit expires.

References
 California Oil and Gas Fields, Volumes I, II and III. Vol. I (1998), Vol. II (1992), Vol. III (1982). California Department of Conservation, Division of Oil, Gas, and Geothermal Resources (DOGGR). 1,472 pp. Ventura Oil Field information pp. 572–574. PDF file available on CD from www.consrv.ca.gov.
 California Department of Conservation, Oil and Gas Statistics, Annual Report, December 31, 2008.
 Keller, Margaret.  Ventura Basin Province, U.S. Geological Survey Digital Data Series DDS-30, Release 2, one CD-ROM, 19 p. + supporting maps, figures, and tables.  Available here

Notes

Oil fields in California
Geology of Ventura County, California
Geography of Ventura County, California
Landmarks in Ventura County, California
Oxnard, California